The San Antonio de Padua del Quemado Chapel in Cordova, New Mexico was listed on the National Register of Historic Places in 1978.

It is an L-shaped building made of adobe bricks, built in 1832 to serve the village of Cordova.

It is located off New Mexico State Road 76.

See also
San Antonio de Padua Church, in Pecos, New Mexico, also NRHP-listed in 1978

References

		
National Register of Historic Places in Rio Arriba County, New Mexico
Roman Catholic churches completed in 1832
Roman Catholic churches in New Mexico
19th-century Roman Catholic church buildings in the United States